Robert de Reddinge was an English preaching friar, of the Dominican order; converted to Judaism about 1275. He appears to have studied Hebrew and by that means to have become interested in Judaism. He married a Jew, and was circumcised, taking the name of Hagin. Edward I, when he heard of this, brought the case before the Archbishop of Canterbury. It is said that this was one of the causes which led the king and his mother, Eleanor, to aim at the expulsion of the Jews from England.

References 
 Copied from: Joseph Jacobs, "Reddinge, Robert de", in the Jewish Encyclopedia (referencing: Grätz, Gesch. vii. 421–422.)

13th-century births
13th-century converts to Judaism
Year of death missing
Converts to Judaism from Roman Catholicism
English Dominicans
13th-century English Jews